Raga (Sanskrit: राग,; Pali ;) is a Buddhist and Hindu concept of character affliction or poison referring to any form of "greed, sensuality, lust, desire" or "attachment to a sensory object". Raga is represented in the Buddhist artwork (Sanskrit: bhāvacakra) as the bird or rooster. In Hinduism, it is one of the five Kleshas or poisons that afflict the soul. In Buddhism, Raga is identified in the following contexts:
 One of the three poisons within the Mahayana Buddhist tradition
 One of the three unwholesome roots within the Theravada Buddhist tradition
 One of the six root kleshas within the Mahayana Abhidharma teachings
 One of the fourteen unwholesome mental factors within the Theravada Abhidharma teachings

Definitions
 literally means 'color or hue' in Sanskrit, but appears in Buddhist texts as a form of blemish, personal impurity or fundamental character affliction. The term Raga also refers to a melodic mode in Indian music. As a Buddhist philosophical concept, the term refers to 'greed, sensuality, desire' or 'attachment to a sensory object'. It includes any form of desire including sexual desire and sensual passion, as well as attachments to, excitement over and pleasure derived from objects of the senses. Some scholars render it as 'craving'.

Raga is one of three poisons and afflictions, also called the "threefold fires" in Buddhist Pali canon, that prevents a being from reaching nirvana. To extinguish all raga (greed, lust, desire, attachment) is one of the requirements of nirvana (liberation) in Buddhism.

The Abhidharma-samuccaya states: 
What is craving (raga)? It is attachment to the three realms of existence. Its function consists of engendering suffering.

Raga is said to arise from the identification of the self as being separate from everything else. This mis-perception or misunderstanding is referred to as avidya (ignorance).

See also
 Karma in Buddhism
 Saṅkhāra
 Taṇhā
 Three poisons

References

Sources
 Ajahn Sucitto (2010). Turning the Wheel of Truth: Commentary on the Buddha's First Teaching. Shambhala.
 Goleman, Daniel (2008). Destructive Emotions: A Scientific Dialogue with the Dalai Lama. Bantam. Kindle Edition.
 Guenther, Herbert V. &  Leslie S. Kawamura (1975), Mind in Buddhist Psychology: A Translation of Ye-shes rgyal-mtshan's "The Necklace of Clear Understanding" Dharma Publishing. Kindle Edition.
 Kunsang, Erik Pema (translator) (2004). Gateway to Knowledge, Vol. 1. North Atlantic Books.
 Leifer, Ron (1997). The Happiness Project. Snow Lion.
 Ringu Tulku (2005). Daring Steps Toward Fearlessness: The Three Vehicles of Tibetan Buddhism, Snow Lion.

External links
 Ranjung Yeshe wiki entry for 'dod chags

Unwholesome factors in Buddhism
Sanskrit words and phrases